Chris Temple (born May 20, 1989) is an American documentary filmmaker. In 2012, he co-founded the non-profit production company Optimist.

Career 

Temple first documentary was Living on One Dollar in 2012. The film focuses on life in extreme poverty in the rural Guatemalan town of Pena Blanca. It was co-created with Zach Ingrasci, Sean Leonard, and Ryan Christoffersen. The film released on Netflix in 2015.

In 2015, Temple co-directed his second documentary Salam Neighbor. The film documents life inside of the Za'atari refugee camp and was a co-production with 1001 Media. The film premiered at AFI Docs film festival in 2015 and released on Netflix in 2016. The film was awarded the 2016 Muslim Public Affairs Council Annual Media Awards.

Temple's filmography also includes co-directing The Undocumented Lawyer (HBO 2020), Five Years North (PBS, 2020), Free to Care (2022), This Is Not Financial Advice (2023), and The Untitled Ethereum Film (2023). He produced Rosa - These Storms (The Atlantic 2016) and Paperboy Love Prince Runs for Mayor (2022). Temple is also a frequent keynote speaker and contributor to the Huffington Post.

Awards 

 2015 Top 100 Visionary Leaders by Real Leaders Magazine
 2017 Daily Point of Light Award
 2020 DuPont-Columbia Award Finalist for outstanding journalism
 2022 Imagen Award Finalist
 2022 40 Under 40 by HBO and DOC NYC

References 

1989 births
Living people